Schefflera albido-bracteata is a species of plant in the family Araliaceae. It is endemic to the Philippines.

References

Endemic flora of the Philippines
albido-bracteata
Endangered plants
Taxonomy articles created by Polbot
Taxobox binomials not recognized by IUCN